Weidner Field is a soccer-specific stadium located in downtown Colorado Springs, Colorado, United States. Opened on April 24, 2021, it is home to Colorado Springs Switchbacks FC, which competes in the second level of U.S. men's professional soccer, the USL Championship (USLC). While designed mainly for soccer, with a capacity of 8,000 for that sport, the stadium will be capable of hosting other types of events, with a capacity as great as 15,000 for concerts. It replaces the former Weidner Field, now known as Switchbacks Training Stadium, a smaller venue in the east of the city.

The stadium is part of a larger project by the city of Colorado Springs known as City of Champions. The Switchbacks' interest in a new stadium stemmed partially from the creation of the third-level USL League One by the USLC's operator, United Soccer League. The club was concerned that without firm plans for a stadium upgrade, its second-division status was not guaranteed. Plans for the new stadium, also including a surrounding entertainment district, were officially unveiled in July 2018. Design details were revealed in July 2019, and the ceremonial groundbreaking took place that December.

Naming rights are held by Weidner Apartment Homes, a minority owner of Switchbacks FC and sponsor of the old stadium. The "Weidner Field" name was officially transferred from the old stadium to the new venue on October 15, 2020.

References

External links
Official website

Colorado Springs Switchbacks FC
Sports venues in Colorado Springs, Colorado
Tourist attractions in Colorado Springs, Colorado
Soccer venues in Colorado
Sports venues completed in 2021
USL Championship stadiums
Premier Lacrosse League venues
2021 establishments in Colorado